Dusit is the Thai name for Tushita, the fourth heavenly realm in Buddhist cosmology. The name may refer to:

Dusit District, a district of Bangkok
Dusit Palace, namesake of the district
Dusit Subdistrict, Bangkok, in Dusit District
Dusit Subdistrict, Nakhon Si Thammarat, in Tham Phannara District
Dusit International, a Thai hospitality company
Suan Dusit University, sometimes shortened as Dusit, formerly known as Suan Dusit Rajabhat University and part of the Rajabhat University system
Chut Thai Dusit, a dress style of the formal Thai national costume

See also
Dusit (name)
Dusit Thani (disambiguation)